Liu Ming-huang (born 17 September 1984) is a Taiwanese archer who competed at the 2004 Summer Olympics.

Liu competed for the Republic of China (as Chinese Taipei) at the 2004 Summer Olympics in men's individual archery. He won his first match, advancing to the round of 32, but was later defeated in the second round of elimination. His final rank was 26th overall. Liu was also a member of Chinese Taipei's men's archery team, which won a silver medal.

References
Liu Ming Huang at Sports Reference

1984 births
Living people
Archers at the 2004 Summer Olympics
Olympic archers of Taiwan
Olympic silver medalists for Taiwan
People from Nantou County
Olympic medalists in archery
Asian Games medalists in archery
Archers at the 2002 Asian Games
Taiwanese male archers

Medalists at the 2004 Summer Olympics
Asian Games silver medalists for Chinese Taipei
Medalists at the 2002 Asian Games
21st-century Taiwanese people